Falsozeargyra wegneri is a species of beetle in the family Cerambycidae, and the only species in the genus Falsozeargyra. It was described by Stephan von Breuning in 1963.

References

Desmiphorini
Beetles described in 1963
Taxa named by Stephan von Breuning (entomologist)